Milo Cress (born 2001) is the founder of and spokesperson for the Be Straw Free campaign which has a partnership with Eco-Cycle.

Activism 
Founding the campaign in 2011 when he was 9, Cress advocates for restaurants and other venues to cut down on their use of disposable straws. Also at the age of 9, Cress conducted research by surveying straw manufacturers which estimated that 500 million straws are used daily by Americans, a figure that has been widely cited by major news organizations but has also been criticized as being inaccurate due to his age at the time. Market research firm Freedonia Group estimated the number to be 390 million. Another market research firm Technomic estimated the number to be 170 million, although this number excludes some types of straws.

The National Restaurant Association recognized his "offer-first" policy as a best practice. Upon meeting Peter Shumlin on February 9, 2011, Milo stated: "Here's the thing: This planet is not a place that kids will inherit at some point, far off in the distant future. We live here right now, and share this planet already, which is why it's so important that we take individual and collective responsibility for its well being." Colorado Governor John Hickenlooper cited Cress's activism in a 2013 proclamation that made July 11 a straw-free day in the state and the mayor of Manly, in New South Wales, Australia, declared "offer first" a best practice.

Milo has a large following in South Korea. Milo has traveled around the world talking to organizations about his “offer first” idea and about how children can become activists in their own ways. In 2014, he was a finalist for the Gloria Barron Prize for Young Heroes.

In a testimony to the Vermont House of Representatives Energy and Technology Committee regarding development and implementation of artificial intelligence technologies on February 14, 2018, Milo stated: "Acting with foresight beats reacting in hindsight pretty much every time."

Cress is currently an undergraduate at the Massachusetts Institute of Technology.

References 

American environmentalists
Green thinkers
Living people
2001 births